The Punjab Legislative Assembly or the Punjab Vidhan Sabha is the unicameral legislature of the state of Punjab in India. The Sixteenth Punjab Legislative Assembly was constituted in March 2022. At present, it consists of 117 members, directly elected from 117 single-seat constituencies.  The tenure of the Legislative Assembly is five years unless dissolved sooner. The Speaker of the sixteenth assembly is Kultar Singh Sandhwan. The meeting place of the Legislative Assembly since 6 March 1961 is the Vidhan Bhavan in Chandigarh.

History 

In the British Raj, an Executive Council was formed under The Indian Councils Act, 1861. It was only under the Government of India Act 1919 that a Legislative Council was set up in Punjab.  Later, under the Government of India Act 1935, the Punjab Legislative Assembly was constituted with a membership of 175. It was summoned for the first time on 1 April 1937. In 1947, Punjab Province was partitioned into West Punjab and East Punjab and the East Punjab Legislative Assembly was formed, the forerunner of the current assembly consisting of 79 members.

After the independence of India, on 15 July 1948, eight princely states of East Punjab grouped together to form a single state, Patiala and East Punjab States Union. The Punjab State Legislature was a bicameral house in April 1952, comprising the Vidhan Sabha (lower house) and Vidhan Parishad (upper house). In 1956 that state was largely merged into Punjab, the strength of the Vidhan Parishad of the new State of Punjab was enhanced from 40 seats to 46 seats and in 1957, it was increased to 51. Punjab was trifurcated in 1966 to form Haryana, Himachal Pradesh, and Punjab. The Vidhan Parishad was reduced to 40 seats and the Vidhan Sabha was grown by 50 seats to 104 seats. On 1 January 1970, the Vidhan Parishad was abolished leaving the state with a unicameral legislature.

Legislature 

The legislature comprises the governor and the Punjab Legislative Assembly, which is the highest political organ in the state. The governor has the power to summon the assembly or to close the same. All members of the legislative assembly are directly elected, normally once in every five years by the eligible voters who are above 18 years of age. The current assembly consists of 117 elected members. The elected members select one of its own members as its chairperson who is called the speaker of the assembly. The speaker is assisted by the deputy speaker who is also elected by the members. The conduct of a meeting in the house is the responsibility of the speaker.

The main function of the assembly is to pass laws and rules. Every bill passed by the house has to be finally approved by the governor before it becomes applicable.

The normal term of the legislative assembly is five years from the date appointed for its first meeting.

Sixteenth Assembly

Past election results 

 ^ - Party didn't contest election
 ~ - Party didn't exist
 - Green color box indicates the party/parties who formed the government
 - Red color box indicates the official opposition party

List of Punjab Legislative Assemblies

Committee on Local Bodies

Punjab Assembly Committee on Local Bodies of Punjab Legislative Assembly is constituted annually for a one-year period from among the members of the Assembly. This Committee consists of thirteen members. The chairperson and the members are appointed by the Punjab Assembly speaker. In 2021, Punjab Assembly 'Committee Local Bodies and Panchayati Raj Institutions' has been split into committees, namely 'Committee on Local Bodies' and 'Committee on Panchayati Raj Institutions'.

The purpose of the committee is to do a Legislative oversight of the Local Bodies and institutions in Punjab state. The committee also conducts surveys and inspections to observe, inspect and collect information on the work done by the local bodies. It also monitors the work of the Punjab Pollution Control Board.

Overview
The speaker appoints the committees as per the powers conferred by Article 208 of the Constitution of India read with section 32 of the States Re-organisation Act, 1956 (37 of 1956), and in pursuance of Rules 232(1) and 2(b) of the Rules of Procedure and Conduct of Business in the Punjab Vidhan Sabha (Punjab Legislative Assembly).

According to the Punjab Government Gazette, 2021 the functions of the committee are defined below.

Current members
For the one-year period starting May 2022, the Committee on Local Bodies of 16th Punjab Assembly had following members:

Chairpersons

Previous members

2020–21

2019–20

2018–19

2017–18

See also 
PEPSU
Interim East Punjab Assembly
List of governors of Punjab (India)
List of constituencies of Punjab Legislative Assembly
List of Deputy Chief Ministers of Punjab (India)
List of Speakers of Punjab Legislative Assembly
List of Leader of Opposition in Punjab Legislative Assembly

References

External links 
 

 
Unicameral legislatures